The discography of English comedy band The Midnight Beast consists of two studio albums, three EPs, and twenty-five singles.

In 2012, following the release of the first season of their self-titled television series, the band released their debut self-titled album on their own label, Sounds Like Good. The album consisted of 13 tracks from the television series, as well as two bonus tracks. On the CD release of the album, the bonus track Nerds replaced the bonus track Too Many Drunk Girls. The album peaked at number 10 on the UK Indie Albums chart.

Following the finale of season two of their series, the band released their second album Shtick Heads in June 2016. The album peaked at number 74 on the UK Albums Top 100 chart.

In 2018, the band released a new 'Claws' logo, that would serve as the artwork for their third album, "The Album Nobody Asked For." which was released on 24 August 2018, and the artwork for the album's five singles.

Studio albums

Soundtracks

EPs

Singles

Releases from The Midnight Beast sitcom

Other charting tracks

References 

Discographies of British artists